The 2016 KPN Renewables Bangkok Open was a professional tennis tournament played on hard courts. It was the first edition of the tournament which was part of the 2016 ATP Challenger Tour. It took place in Bangkok, Thailand between 16 and 22 May 2016.

Singles main-draw entrants

Seeds

 1 Rankings are as of May 9, 2016.

Other entrants
The following players received wildcards into the singles main draw:
  Phassawit Burapharitta
  Jirat Navasirisomboon
  Wishaya Trongcharoenchaikul
  Kittipong Wachiramanowong

The following player received protected ranking entry into the singles main draw:
  Rémi Boutillier
 
The following players received entry from the qualifying draw:
  Sam Barry 
  Lloyd Glasspool
  Yuya Kibi
  Sidharth Rawat

Champions

Singles

 James Duckworth def.  Sam Barry, 7–6(7–5), 6–4

Doubles

 Chen Ti /  Jason Jung def.  Dean O'Brien /  Ruan Roelofse, 6–4, 3–6, [10–8]

 
 ATP Challenger Tour
Tennis, ATP Challenger Tour, KPN Renewables Bangkok Open
Tennis, ATP Challenger Tour, KPN Renewables Bangkok Open

Tennis, ATP Challenger Tour, KPN Renewables Bangkok Open